JHipster is a free and open-source application generator used to quickly develop modern web applications and Microservices using Angular or React (JavaScript library) and the Spring Framework.

Overview 

JHipster provides tools to generate a project with a Java stack on the server side (using Spring Boot) and a responsive Web front-end on the client side (with Angular/ReactJs and Bootstrap). It can also create microservice stack with support for Netflix OSS, Docker and Kubernetes.

The term 'JHipster' comes from 'Java Hipster', as its initial goal was to use all the modern and 'hype' tools available at the time. Today, it has reached a more enterprise goal, with a strong focus on developer productivity, tooling and quality.

Major functionalities 

 Generate full stack applications and microservices, with many options
 Generate CRUD entities, directly or by scaffolding
 Database migrations with Liquibase
 NoSQL databases support (Cassandra, MongoDB, Neo4j)
 Elasticsearch support
 Websockets support
 Automatic deployment to CloudFoundry, Heroku, OpenShift, AWS

Technology stack 

On the client side:

 HTML5 Boilerplate
 Twitter Bootstrap
 AngularJS
 Angular 2+
 React
 Full internationalization support with Angular Translate
 Optional Compass / Sass support for CSS design
 Optional WebSocket support with Spring Websocket

On the server side:

 Spring Boot
 Spring Security (including Social Logins)
 Spring MVC REST + Jackson
 Monitoring with Metrics
 Optional WebSocket support with Spring Websocket
 Spring Data JPA + Bean Validation
 Database updates with Liquibase
 Elasticsearch support
 MongoDB support
 Cassandra support
 Neo4j support

Out-of-the-box auto-configured tooling:

 Yeoman
 Webpack or Gulp.js
 BrowserSync
 Maven or Gradle
 Editor for Datamodeling (visual and textual)

Books 
A JHipster mini book  is written by Matt Raible, the author of AppFuse.

A book on "Full stack development with JHipster"  is written by Deepu K Sasidharan, the co-lead of JHipster and Sendil Kumar N, a core team member of JHipster. Reviewed by Julien Dubois and Antonio Goncalves.

See also 
 MEAN (software bundle)

References

External links
 

Java platform
Web frameworks
Free software programmed in Java (programming language)
Agile software development
Software using the Apache license